Royal Prussian Jagdstaffel 49, commonly abbreviated to Jasta 49, was a  ("hunting squadron", i.e. fighter squadron) of the , the air arm of the Imperial German Army during World War I. The squadron scored 28 aerial victories during the war, including at least one observation balloon. The unit's victories came at the expense of one pilot killed in action and three wounded in action.

History
It went operational on 9 January 1918. On 17 January, it was assigned to 17 Armee. The squadron's commander claimed its first aerial victory on 27 March 1918. On 3 April 1918, it transferred to 4 Armee. In late May, it was posted to 6 Armee. The following month, it was integrated into Jagdgruppe 9 to support 2 Armee. On 8 July 1918, it moved to its final wartime posting, serving as part of Jagdgruppe A with 3 Armee.

Commanding officer
 Franz Ray (with Hermann Habich as deputy)

Duty stations
 Cottbus: 23 December 1917
 Schloss Villiers-Campeau: 13 January 1918
 Monveaux: 3 April 1918
 Lomme: Late May 1918
 Ennemain: June 1918
 Blaise: 8 July 1918
 Chémery
 Medard, Germany: 22 October 1918

Aircraft operated
 Fokker D.VII fighter

References

Bibliography
 

49
Military units and formations established in 1917
1917 establishments in Germany
Military units and formations disestablished in 1918